Cryptocephalus marginatus is a cylindrical leaf beetle belonging to the family Chrysomelidae, subfamily Cryptocephalinae. The species was first described by Johan Christian Fabricius in 1781.

Description
Cryptocephalus marginatus can reach a length of 3.5 – 5 mm. This species shows an evident sexual dimorphism. The females are generally much larger than males. The males usually are black with blue metallic reflections, while the females have yellow elytra with black margins.

Adults can be found from May to August in the lowlands and in the lower parts of mountains on Betula verrucosa, Alnus viridis, Sorbus aucuparia and various species of oaks.

Distribution
This species is present in Austria, Belgium, Bosnia, Bulgaria, Croatia, the Czech Republic, Finland, France, Germany, Hungary, Italy, Poland, Romania, Russia, Slovenia, Spain, Switzerland, the Netherlands and in the former Yugoslavia.

References
 BioLib
 Fauna Europaea

External links
 Biol.uni.wroc.pl
 Hlasek
 Coleoptera Poloniae

marginatus
Beetles of Europe
Taxa named by Johan Christian Fabricius
Beetles described in 1781